Tomáš Fleissner (born 20 August 1960) is a Czech modern pentathlete. He competed for Czechoslovakia at the 1988 and 1992 Summer Olympics.

References

External links
 
 

1960 births
Living people
Czech male modern pentathletes
Czechoslovak male modern pentathletes
Olympic modern pentathletes of Czechoslovakia
Modern pentathletes at the 1988 Summer Olympics
Modern pentathletes at the 1992 Summer Olympics
Sportspeople from Plzeň